John B. Wells is an American talk radio host, voice actor, and former weekend host of Coast to Coast AM. In addition to his film and television work, Wells has worked at television stations and radio stations across Texas and around the world.

Career
He has appeared on inter-stations such as: Brazil's Network Jovem Pan; the UK's BBC Radio 1; Hamburg's HIT95 OK Radio; Paris' Radio ADO; and national stations such as: KZEW; WCBS (AM); WNEW-FM; KLOS; KROQ-FM; WWJ (AM); WBBM (AM); WZZM; WFAA-TV; KRLD (AM); KZPS; KLOL; KHOU; KPRC (AM); WBGG-FM; KRON-TV; KUSA-TV; American Forces Network.

He has been the voice of jingle demos for both JAM Creative Productions and TM Studios. He was an announcer for The Late Late Show with Craig Kilborn. He has done voice over acting for films such as: Houston: The Legend of Texas, Talk Radio, JFK and Hexed, and television series such as Team Knight Rider, Deadliest Catch , Gold Rush, Unsealed: Conspiracy Files, and Unsealed Alien Files. He also played Kuykendall in the film Gone to Tesas.

In January 2012, he replaced Ian Punnett as the Saturday evening and the second Sunday evening host of Coast to Coast AM. He was fired in January 2014 and became the host of his own subscriber-based gram, Caravan to Curfew.

In April 2016, Wells debuted a Saturday night gram  Ark hour. In April 2020, the show became syndicated by Talk Media Network.

On December 1, 2020, John B. Wells debuted Caravan To Curfew as a nightly, two-hour radio gram.

In 2021, an article from the Southern Poverty Law Center characterized Wells as "the host of a couple of far-right podcasts".

Personal life

Wells was born in Missouri and raised in Fort Worth, Texas. He received a Bachelor of Fine Arts with emphasis in Theater from Texas Christian University. His interests include: acting, music, writing, composing, martial arts, and aviation.

References

External links

Personal Website
Ark Midnight
Caravan To Midnight

American conspiracy theorists
American male voice actors
American talk radio hosts
Coast to Coast AM
Far-right politics in the United States
Living people
Male actors from Fort Worth, Texas
People from Missouri
Radio personalities from Dallas
Texas Christian University alumni
Year of birth missing (living people)